Alexander Black may refer to:

 Alexander Black (athlete) (born 2000), Semi-professional Australian rules footballer
 Alexander Black (actor) (born 1983), American film actor
 Alexander Black (theologian) (1789–1864), theologian and Free Church of Scotland minister
 Alexander Black (architect) (1790–1858), Scottish architect based in Edinburgh
 Alexander Black (surveyor) (1827–1897), Scottish-born surveyor in Victoria, Australia
 Alexander Black (Canadian politician) (1832–1913), political figure in Manitoba
 Alexander Black (photographer) (1859–1940), American author and inventor of the pre-cinema “Picture Play”
 Alexander William Black (1859–1906), Liberal Party politician in Scotland